Kang Hyun-wook (Hanja: 姜賢旭; born 27 March 1938) is a South Korean politician who served as the governor of North Jeolla Province from May 1988 to June 1990 and then again from July 2002 to June 2006. He also served as South Korea's Minister of Agriculture, Forestry, and Fisheries from 1992 to 1993, as South Korea's Minister of the Environment from 1996 to 1997, and as the South Korean National Assemblyman representing Gunsan from May 1996 to June 2002.

Early life and education
Kang was born in March 1938 in what is now Gunsan, South Korea. He graduated from Gunsan Middle School in 1954 and Gunsan High School in 1957. He received a bachelor's degree in Foreign Studies from the Seoul National University in 1961.

Career
Kang has served as a Vice Minister of Economic Planning, Vice Minister of MOCIE.

From December 1996 to August 1997, Kang was South Korea's Minister of the Environment.

From 1992 to 1993, Kang was South Korea's Minister of Agriculture, Forestry, and Fisheries.

From May 1996 to June 2002, Kang was the 15th and 16th National Assemblyman representing Gunsan.

From 1988 to 1990 and then again from July 2002 to June 2006, Kang was the governor of North Jeolla Province.

Personal life
Kang is Catholic and he was baptized as Paul.

References

1938 births
Living people
People from Gunsan
Governors of North Jeolla Province
Members of the National Assembly (South Korea)